Fredrik Forsberg (born December 12, 1996) is a Swedish professional ice hockey player. He is currently playing with HV71 of the Swedish Hockey League (SHL).

Forsberg made his Swedish Hockey League debut playing with Leksands IF during the 2013–14 SHL season.

Personal life
Fredrik is the younger brother of Filip Forsberg who was drafted 11th overall in the 2012 NHL Entry Draft by the Washington Capitals. Filip now plays for the Nashville Predators. The brothers are of no relation to former NHL star Peter Forsberg.

References

External links

1996 births
Bofors IK players
HV71 players
IK Oskarshamn players
Leksands IF players
Living people
Swedish ice hockey forwards
Sportspeople from Uppsala